Jil Teichmann was the defending champion, but chose not to participate. 

Fiona Ferro won the title, defeating Anett Kontaveit in the final, 6–2, 7–5. Ferro became the first player to win a title on the WTA tour following the suspension of the tour due to the COVID-19 pandemic in March 2020.

Seeds

Draw

Finals

Top half

Bottom half

Qualifying

Seeds

Qualifiers

Lucky loser

Draw

First qualifier

Second qualifier

Third qualifier

Fourth qualifier

References

External links
Main draw
Qualifying draw

Internazionali Femminili di Palermo - Singles
2020 Singles
Torneo